Anny Divya (born 1987) is an Indian pilot.

Early life
Anny was born into a Telugu speaking family. Her father served in the Indian Army. The family lived near the army base camp in Pathankot in the Indian state of Punjab. After her father retired, their family settled down in Vijayawada, Andhra Pradesh, where Anny attended school.

Career
After completing her schooling at age 17, she enrolled at Indira Gandhi Rashtriya Uran Akademi (IGRUA), the flying school in Uttar Pradesh. At 19 she completed her training and started her career with Air India. She travelled to Spain for training and flew a Boeing 737. At age 21 she was sent to London for further training, where she started flying the Boeing 777. She also holds an LLB degree from Rizvi Law College of University of Mumbai.

References

Living people
1987 births
Women from Punjab, India
Air India
Indian women aviators